Star's Echo, also known as , is a 2-part mini-series broadcast by MBC and Fuji TV in 2004. It is the third collaboration by South Korean and Japanese television companies, after Friends in 2001 and Passing Rain in 2002.

Synopsis
The story is centered on the love between a musically gifted South Korean man, Sung-jae (Jo Hyun-jae), and a Japanese woman, Misaki (Nakagoshi Noriko). Misaki, who feels guilty over her boyfriend's death, is transferred to Korean and meets Sung-jae who helps her cure her wounds of the past memories with love.

Cast
Jo Hyun-jae as Sung-jae
Noriko Nakagoshi as Misaki
Lee Da-hae as Ji-young
Tanihara Shosuke as Suji
Tomoka Kurotani as Tomoko
Lee Joon-gi as Chan-gyu
Kim Yong-hee as Min-suk

Production credits
MBC Staff
Chief Producer: Kim Nam-won (김남원)
Director: Kim Nam-won (김남원), Go Dong-sun (고동선)
Producer: Yeo In-joon (여인준)

Fuji TV Staff
Chief Producer: Honma Ohiko (本間欧彦)
Director: Kobayashi Kazuhiro
Producer: Nakajima Kumiko (中島久美子)

References

External links
Official Homepage 

MBC TV television dramas
2004 in South Korean television
2000s South Korean television series
Fuji TV dramas
South Korean romance television series